Henry Odom (born February 12, 1959) is a former American football running back. He played for the Pittsburgh Steelers in 1983 and for the Orlando Renegades in 1985.

References

1959 births
Living people
American football running backs
South Carolina State Bulldogs football players
Pittsburgh Steelers players
Washington Federals/Orlando Renegades players
Players of American football from South Carolina
People from Bamberg, South Carolina